Alessandro Bisolti (born 7 March 1985) is an Italian professional racing cyclist, who currently rides for UCI Continental team . He was named in the start list for the 2016 Giro d'Italia.

Major results

2006
 1st  Overall Giro della Valle d'Aosta
1st  Points classification
 6th Overall Giro ciclistico della provincia di Cosenza
 6th Overall Giro Ciclistico d'Italia
 6th GP Capodarco
 7th Cronoscalata Gardone V.T. - Prati di Caregno
 8th Gara Milionaria - Tr. Marini Silvano Cappelli Sp.
 10th Trofeo Internazionale Bastianelli
2007
 3rd Overall Volta a Lleida
 3rd Trofeo Gianfranco Bianchin
 5th Gran Premio Palio del Recioto
 6th Piccolo Giro di Lombardia
 8th Trofeo Franco Balestra
2008
 5th Overall Volta a Lleida
 7th Overall Giro della Valle d'Aosta
2010
 8th Gran Premio Industria e Commercio di Prato
 8th Giro di Toscana
2012
 5th GP Industria & Artigianato di Larciano
 6th Gran Premio Nobili Rubinetterie
 10th Grand Prix Südkärnten
2014
 10th Overall Istrian Spring Trophy
2017
 9th Gran Premio di Lugano
2018
 3rd Overall Tour of Bihor
 9th Overall Sibiu Cycling Tour
2019
 7th Overall La Tropicale Amissa Bongo
 8th Overall Tour de Langkawi
 8th Overall Tour de la Mirabelle

Grand Tour general classification results timeline

References

External links
 
 
 

1985 births
Living people
Italian male cyclists
Cyclists from the Province of Brescia